Pablo Jose Barroso is a Mexican film producer, known for his work in creating Catholic-themed films.

Filmography
 Guadalupe, (2006)
 Hacia la vida, (short, 2009)
 Treasure Hunters, (2011)
 The Greatest Miracle, (2011)
 For Greater Glory, (2012)
 Max & Me, (upcoming)

References

Mexican film producers
Year of birth missing (living people)
Living people
Place of birth missing (living people)
21st-century Mexican people